Ösel Tendzin, born Thomas Frederick Rich Jr. (June 28, 1943 – August 25, 1990), was an American Buddhist. He was the principal student of Chögyam Trungpa. On August 22, 1976, Trungpa empowered Tendzin as his Vajra Regent and first Western lineage holder in the Karma Kagyu and Nyingma schools of Tibetan Buddhism. On August 25, 1990, Tendzin died of HIV/AIDS in San Francisco, California, aged 47. His wife, Lila Rich, and a group of his students continue to live in Ojai, California.

History

Early life
Tendzin's original full birth name was Thomas Frederick Rich Jr. He was born on June 28, 1943 in Passaic, New Jersey. He graduated in 1965 from Fordham University, initially working as a physical therapist in New York and Los Angeles. Before joining Trungpa's Vajradhatu community, he studied with Satchidananda Saraswati, who gave him the name Narayana.

Vajradhatu
In February 1971, Tendzin first met Trungpa in Boulder, Colorado. According to Tendzin, Trungpa revealed his intention to make Tendzin his successor not long after their initial meeting. Starting in 1973 Tendzin held various roles in Vajradhatu's management. He served on the initial board of directors and as an executive vice-president. In April 1976, Tendzin's Regency was announced to the community for the first time. Trungpa recounted the moment in a later edition of his memoir, writing, "to ensure that everything will not stop at my death, it is necessary to have one person as an inheritor, someone whom I can train and observe over a period of many years. For a long time it was in my mind to appoint Narayana to this role, and in the summer of 1976 I did so, empowering him as Dorje Gyaltsap, Vajra Regent."

In his foreword to the Tendzin's 1987 book Buddha in the Palm of Your Hand, Trungpa elaborated on his decision:

Tendzin assumed leadership of the organization in 1987 after Trungpa's death.

Satdharma
In 1989, Tendzin moved to Ojai, California with some of his students. After his death, those students led by Patrick Sweeney — whom Tendzin had chosen as his lineage holder and successor — created an organization called Satdharma. It was formally incorporated in 1992 to continue Tendzin's lineage, separate from Vajradhatu.

Controversy
Among Tendzin's controversial actions was his rejection of the recommendation of senior Kagyu lineage holder the Tai Situpa to take over leadership of Vajradhatu in conjunction with Chögyam Trungpa's half-brother, Damchu Tenphel, who resided in Tibet. This was "regarded by members as a serious slight to lineage authorities and was construed as the Regent's attempt to secure his position of control."

Also controversial was the fact that Tendzin "took further action to buttress his centrality by denying students permission to seek teachings from other Kagyu Tibetan teachers, claiming that only he possessed the special transmission, materials and knowledge unique to the Trungpa lineage. Students were told that if they wanted to practice within the community, they would have to take spiritual instruction from the Regent."

Other behavior was troubling as well. As one scholar who has studied the community noted, Tendzin was "bisexual and known to be very promiscuous" and "enjoyed seducing straight men" but the community "did not find [this behavior] particularly troublesome." Not all his partners were unwilling; one scholar noted "it became a mark of prestige for a man, gay or straight, to have sex with the Regent, just as it had been for a woman to have sex with [Trungpa] Rinpoche", but at least one student reported that Tendzin had raped him. As a former Vajradhatu member attested, "a chilling story had recently been reported by one of ... [the] teachers at the Buddhist private school [for the Vajradhatu community]. This straight, married male was pinned face-down across Rich's desk by the guards [the Dorje Kasung] while Rich forcibly raped him."

It was revealed in 1989 that Tendzin had contracted HIV and for nearly three years knew it, yet continued to have unprotected sex with his students without informing them. He transmitted it to a student who later died of AIDS. Others close to Tendzin, including Vajradhatu's board of directors, knew for two years that Tendzin was HIV-positive and sexually active but kept silent. As one student reported at the time:

Stephen Butterfield, a former student, recounted in a memoir:

Butterfield noted:

According to Diana Mukpo, Trungpa's wife and widow, he ultimately became disillusioned with Tendzin as his heir, and during his final illness he called Tendzin "terrible" and "dreadful" and indicated that he would have gotten rid of him had he had a suitable candidate to replace him with. Rick Fields, the editor of Vajradhatu's publication the Vajradhatu Sun, wrote that he resigned from his editorial position after Tendzin and the board of directors stopped him from publishing news of the events.

Bibliography
 Buddha in the Palm of Your Hand, Shambhala Publications. Boston, 1982. 0-87773-223-X
 Space, Time and Energy, Vajra Regent Ösel Tendzin, Satdharma Publications, 2000.
 Like Water Poured into Water, Vajra Regent Ösel Tendzin, Foreword by Lady Lila Rich; Introduction by Patrick Sweeney, Satdharma Publications, 2006.

Notes

References
 Butterfield, Stephen T. (1994). The Double Mirror: A Skeptical Journey into Buddhist Tantra. 
Coleman, James William. The New Buddhism: The Western Transformation of an Ancient Tradition (2001) Oxford University Press. 
 Dart, John (1989). "Buddhist Sect Alarmed by Reports that Leader Kept his AIDS a Secret", The Los Angeles Times, March 3, 1989 link
Eldershaw, Lynn P. "Collective identity and the post-charismatic fate of Shambhala International", 2004 Ph. D. thesis, University of Waterloo; also, "Collective Identity and the Postcharismatic Fate of Shambhala International", an article drawn from this thesis  published in Nova Religio: The Journal of Alternative and Emergent Religions, (2007) Vol. 10 No. 4, pp. 72–102, 
 Fields, Rick (1992). How the Swans Came to the Lake. 
 Hayward, Jeremy (2007). Warrior-King of Shambhala: Remembering Chogyam Trungpa 
 Mukpo, Diana (2006). Dragon Thunder: My Life with Chogyam Trungpa, 
 John Steinbeck IV and Nancy Steinbeck (2001). The Other Side of Eden: Life with John Steinbeck, Prometheus Books. 
 Week in Review Desk, "HEADLINERS; A Church's Turmoil," The New York Times, February 26, 1989

External links
Homepage of Satdharma, the organization founded by Ösel Tenzin's dharma heir Patrick Sweeney
NY Times article on conflict in Trungpa's community due to Ösel Tendzin's transmission of AIDS to his students. 

1990 deaths
AIDS-related deaths in California
Lamas
Tibetan Buddhists from the United States
1943 births
People from Passaic, New Jersey
Fordham University alumni
American bisexual people 
Bisexual men
LGBT Buddhists